Vernon Sadahpal (born 17 July 1947) is a Trinidadian cricketer. He played in seven first-class matches for Trinidad and Tobago from 1968 to 1976.

See also
 List of Trinidadian representative cricketers

References

External links
 

1947 births
Living people
Trinidad and Tobago cricketers